Robert Burdett may refer to:

Robert Bordet (d.abt.1159), Lord of Cullei & Prince of Tarragona & cousin to the Burdets of Loseby, Huncote & Seckington
Robert Burdet (Warks MP 1320) (d.1333), MP for Warwickshire and Leicestershire
Robert Burdett (died 1549), MP for Leicester, Leicestershire and Warwickshire
Robert Burdett (fl. 1601), MP for Tamworth (UK Parliament constituency)
Sir Robert Burdett, 3rd Baronet (1640–1716), English MP for Warwickshire 1679–1681 and Lichfield 1689–1698
Sir Robert Burdett, 4th Baronet (1716–1797), his grandson, English MP for Tamworth 1748–1768

See also
Robert Jones Burdette (1844–1914), American humorist and clergyman